Nolan Gerard Funk (born July 28, 1986) is a Canadian actor and singer known for portraying Hunter Clarington in the musical comedy-drama television series Glee, Collin Jennings in the comedy-drama television series Awkward, "Angel Eyes" in the drama series Counterpart and Conrad Birdie in the 2009 Broadway revival of the musical Bye Bye Birdie.

Life and career
Funk was born in Vancouver, British Columbia. In 2001, his first role came when he played a boy named Ryan in the Seven Days episode "The Brink". In 2002, he starred in the short film Moon in the Afternoon as Alexander and appeared in the Taken episode "High Hope" as Young Eric Crawford. 

In 2003, he appeared in Marvel live-action film X2 as a captured X-Kid and guest-starred in Nickelodeon's series Romeo!s episode "Minimum Cool" playing a Bully named Booker. In 2004, he appeared in The L Word episode "Losing It" as a boy named Malcolm. From 2004 to 2006, he guest-starred in Renegadepress.com playing Ben Lalonde. In 2005, he appeared as Zack Greenfield in the Smallville episode "Krypto". In 2006, he played Josh in Hollow Man 2, guest-starred as Allan Harris in the Killer Instinct episode "While You Were Sleeping", appeared in the biographical film A Girl Like Me: The Gwen Araujo Story as Michael Imagidson, The Dead Zone episode "Independence Day" as Jake Phillips, the [[Alice, I Think (TV series)|Alice, I Think]] episode "Wise Womyn" as Daniel Feckworth-Goose and guest-starred in the Supernatural episode "Croatoan" as Jake Tanner. 

In 2007, he starred in My Name Is Sarah as Kit and he had a recurring role in The CW series Aliens in America as a student named Todd Palladino. In 2008, he appeared in Miranda Cosgrove's music video for "Stay My Baby" as her love interest, appeared in Deadgirl as Dwyer and appeared in the Class Savage short film playing a Preppy Dealer.

He received his first break when he was cast opposite Tammin Sursok in the starring role of the Columbia Records/Nickelodeon movie Spectacular! On January 12, 2009, he had his first live concert performance at a Hard Rock Cafe in New York City.

He appeared in Lie To Me’s episode Pilot playing a boy named Dan, he appeared in Castle’s episode Hedge Fund Homeboys playing a student named Brandon and appeared as Kevin in the 18 short films. In 2010, he appeared in Jack's Family Adventure as Derek Vickery, in Bereavement as William, had a recurring role in Warehouse 13 as Todd, Triple Dog as Todd Spalding and in Detroit 1-8-7 as Trevor Elkin.

Funk played the title role of Conrad Birdie in the revival of the Broadway musical Bye Bye Birdie, with a limited run at Henry Miller's Theatre from September 10, 2009 (previews) through January 24, 2010. Even though the show was mostly panned, he was a critical standout – cited as "Excellent" by John Lahr of The New Yorker, and receiving praise from New York Times critic Ben Brantley. He had a guest role as Todd, Claudia Donovan's love interest, on season two of the Syfy series Warehouse 13. In 2012, Funk appeared opposite Jennifer Lawrence and Elisabeth Shue in House at the End of the Street.

Funk guest-starred in season four of Glee, playing Hunter Clarington, the new frontman of the Dalton Academy Warblers. He then had a recurring role in season three of the MTV comedy-drama series Awkward as Collin Jennings.

Funk starred alongside Lindsay Lohan and James Deen in the 2013 erotic thriller-drama film The Canyons, written by novelist Bret Easton Ellis and directed by Paul Schrader. 

That same year, Funk appeared in the third installment of the Chronicles of Riddick film series, Riddick, playing a devoutly religious mercenary named Luna. The film was released on September 6, 2013, and opened at number one. In December 2013, Funk was announced as the face of Versace's spring/summer 2014 menswear campaign, photographed by famed photographers Mert Alas & Marcus Piggott.

Funk was a series regular on the first season of the critically acclaimed Starz series Counterpart starring J.K. Simmons. Funk spoke German in the show and played Angel Eyes, a cult-raised German assassin.

In 2019, Funk was cast as a series regular on the HBO Max series The Flight Attendant opposite Kaley Cuoco.

Awards
In 2021, Funk was nominated for a Screen Actors Guild Award for best ensemble in a comedy series.

In 2007, Funk was nominated for a Leo Award in the "Best Performance or Host in a Youth or Children's Program or Series" category for his work on Renegadepress.com''.

Filmography

References

https://www.hollywoodreporter.com/live-feed/kaley-cuocos-hbo-max-thriller-adds-nolan-gerard-funk-1258916

External links
 

1986 births
21st-century Canadian male actors
Canadian male dancers
Canadian male film actors
Canadian male musical theatre actors
Canadian male singers
Canadian male television actors
IMG Models models
Living people
Male actors from Vancouver
Musicians from Vancouver